Scortecci's dwarf gecko (Lygodactylus scorteccii) is a species of lizard in the family Gekkonidae. The species is native to East Africa.

Etymology
The specific name, scorteccii, is in honor of Italian herpetologist Giuseppe Scortecci.

Geographic range
L. scorteccii is found in Ethiopia, northwestern Kenya, and Somalia.

Reproduction
L. scorteccii is oviparous.

References

Further reading
Pasteur G (1959). "Diagnose de Lygodactylus picturatus scorteccii subsp. nov. (gekkonidés)". Société des Sciences Naturelles et Physiques du Maroc 59 (7): 105–106. (Lygodactylus picturatus scorteccii, new subspecies). (in French).
Rösler H (2000). "Kommentierte Liste der rezent, subrezent und fossil bekannten Geckotaxa (Reptilia: Gekkonomorpha)". Gekkota 2: 28–153. (in German). Lygodactylus (Lygodactylus) scorteccii, p. 94.
Spawls S, Howell K, Hinkel H, Menegon M (2018). Field Guide to East African Reptiles, Second Edition. London: Bloomsbury Natural History. 624 pp. .

Lygodactylus
Reptiles described in 1959
Reptiles of Ethiopia
Reptiles of Kenya
Reptiles of Somalia